Edna May Healey, Baroness Healey (née Edmunds; 14 June 1918 – 21 July 2010) was a British writer, lecturer and filmmaker.

Life and career
Edna May Edmunds was born in the Forest of Dean and educated at  Bells Grammar School, Coleford, Gloucestershire, where she was the first pupil to gain a place at Oxford University.  Her father, Edward Edmunds, was a crane driver who threatened her that failing to apply herself to reading would leave her working in a pin factory. While studying English at St Hugh's College she met Denis Healey, who was studying at Balliol College. She then trained as a teacher and married Healey in 1945 after his military service in World War II. She became Baroness Healey in 1992 when her husband received a life peerage.

Though she began her writing career relatively late in life, her books were critically acclaimed and sometimes best-sellers. She wrote non-fiction books, often biographies of successful women in powerful positions. Lady Healey also made two award-winning television documentaries.

She was elected in 1993 a Fellow of the Royal Society of Literature

Quotations
Edna Healey has one entry in the 8th Edition of The Oxford Dictionary of Quotations where she says of Margaret Thatcher,
"She has no hinterland; in particular she has no sense of history."

Death
She died on 21 July 2010, aged 92. She was survived by Lord Healey, her husband of 65 years, three children and four grandchildren.

Books
 Lady Unknown, the Life of Angela Burdett-Coutts (1978)
 Wives of Fame (1986) (subjects were Mary Livingstone, Jenny Marx and Emma Darwin)
 Coutts and Co (1992)
 The Queen's House: A History of Buckingham Palace (1997)
 Emma Darwin (2001)
 Part of the Pattern (2006) (Lady Healey's memoirs)

Documentaries
 Mrs Livingstone, I Presume (1982)
 One More River, the Life of Mary Slessor in Nigeria (1984)

References

External links
 Edna Healey obituary in The Guardian
 Lady Healey obit in The Telegraph
 Edna May (née Edmunds), Lady Healey (1918-2010), Author, radio and television writer and broadcaster; wife of Baron Healey: Sitter associated with 3 portraits (National Portrait Gallery)

1918 births
2010 deaths
British non-fiction writers
British women writers
British baronesses
People educated at Bells Grammar School
People from Forest of Dean District
Alumni of St Hugh's College, Oxford
Fellows of the Royal Society of Literature
Spouses of life peers